Group 5 of the UEFA Euro 1976 qualifying tournament was one of the eight groups to decide which teams would qualify for the UEFA Euro 1976 finals tournament. Group 5 consisted of four teams: Netherlands, Poland, Italy, and Finland, where they played against each other home-and-away in a round-robin format. The group winners were the Netherlands, who finished tied on points with Poland, but the Netherlands advanced with a better goal difference.

Final table

Matches

 (*)NOTE: Attendance also reported as 28,000

Goalscorers

References
 
 
 

Group 5
Qualifying
1974–75 in Dutch football
1975–76 in Dutch football
1974–75 in Polish football
1975–76 in Polish football
1974–75 in Italian football
1975–76 in Italian football
1974 in Finnish football
1975 in Finnish football